Microsarotis sanderyi is a moth of the family Tortricidae. It is found in Australia, where it has been recorded from Queensland.

Related pages
List of moths of Australia

References

External links
www.ala.org.au: images of the type

Moths of Australia
Moths described in 2006
Grapholitini
Taxa named by Marianne Horak